The Kingsley and Kate Tufts Poetry Awards are a pair of American prizes based at Claremont Graduate University. They are given to poets for their collections of poetry written in the English language, by a citizen or legal resident alien of the United States.

The Kingsley Tufts Poetry Award is a $100,000 prize presented to a mid-career, emerging poet who already possesses an established body of work. The Kingsley Tufts award is known to be one of the world's most lucrative poetry prizes.

Its counterpart, the Kate Tufts Discovery Award, is given to a poet who demonstrates genuine promise in their first book of published poetry, with an attached purse of $10,000.

History

Kingsley Tufts Poetry Award 

Kingsley Tufts held executive positions in the Los Angeles shipyards and wrote poetry as his avocation. His poetry has been featured in The New Yorker, Esquire, and Harpers, among other publications.

Following his death in 1991, Kingsley's wife, Kate, sold her home and the majority of the couple's estate in order to fund an endowment to help poets further their craft. She established the Kingsley Tufts Poetry Award in 1993 at Claremont Graduate University in Claremont, California.

Initially, the award was for $50,000, and has subsequently doubled due to increases in the endowment.  It is intended for an emerging poet who is past the very beginning but has not yet reached the acknowledged pinnacle of their career.

Kate Tufts had no prior affiliation with Claremont Graduate University, but when she met then-university President John Maguire and visited the campus, she became convinced that it was the perfect home for her poetry prize.

Unlike many literary awards, which are coronations for a successful career or body of work, the Kingsley Tufts award was created to both honor the poet and provide the resources that allow artists to continue working.

Kate Tufts said she wanted to create a prize "that would enable a poet to work on his or her craft for a while without paying bills."

The Kate Tufts Discovery Award 

In 1994, just a year after the inauguration of the Kingsley Tufts Poetry Award, Kate Tufts founded the Kate Tufts Discovery Award, which began in the amount of $5,000, but has since doubled to $10,000.

Kate Tufts died in June 1997, at the age of 86. While she did not live to see her awards grow to become some of the largest poetry prizes in the world, she certainly took pride in their inception while she was alive.

Doug Anderson, 1995 Kate Tufts Discovery Award recipient, remembers her sardonic wit when meeting her that year: "She came into the room at the Claremont Graduate School grumbling that she couldn't smoke in there, and then she stopped and looked at Tom Lux [that year's Kingsley Tufts award recipient] and myself. Kate Tufts looked at us and said, 'You don't know how glad I am that this year's awards were given to a couple of really disreputable poets.'"

Judging 

Both awards go through two phases of judging. A preliminary panel of three judges screens the approximately 400 combined applications that are received for both awards. They then pass on finalists to the final judges.

The final panel is composed of five distinguished judges, representing a cross-section of the American poetry community.

2020 

The panel of final judges for the 2017 Kingsley and Kate Tufts Poetry Awards is:

Timothy Donnelly, chair; poet, associate professor at Columbia University, and previous editor of the Boston Review

Cathy Park Hong, poet, poetry editor at the New Republic, and professor at Rutgers University–Newark.

Meghan O’Rourke, poet, essayist, memoirist, and editor of the Yale Review. 

Luis J. Rodriguez, poet, writer, and founding editor of Tia Chucha Press

Sandy Solomon, poet and teacher at Vanderbilt University

2019 

The panel of final judges for the 2017 Kingsley and Kate Tufts Poetry Awards is:

Timothy Donnelly, chair; poet, associate professor at Columbia University, and previous editor of the Boston Review

Cathy Park Hong, poet, poetry editor at the New Republic, and professor at Rutgers University–Newark.

Khadijah Queen, poet, playwright, and Assistant Professor at the University of Colorado at Boulder.

Luis J. Rodriguez, poet, writer, and founding editor of Tia Chucha Press

Sandy Solomon, poet and teacher at Vanderbilt University

2017 

The panel of final judges for the 2017 Kingsley and Kate Tufts Poetry Awards is:

Don Share, chair; poet and editor of Poetry magazine

Elena Karina Byrne, poet, poetry curator/moderator for the Los Angeles Times Festival of Books

Terrance Hayes, 2000 Kate Tufts Discovery Award recipient, poet, and professor at the University of Pittsburgh

Meghan O'Rourke, poet, essayist, editor, and literary critic

Brian Kim Stefans, poet and professor of English at University of California, Los Angeles

2012 

The panel of final judges for the 2012 Kingsley and Kate Tufts Poetry Awards is:

Linda Gregerson, poet, professor at the University of Michigan, and past Kingsley Tufts Poetry Award recipient

David Barber, poet, poetry editor of The Atlantic Monthly

Kate Gale, poet, novelist, managing editor of Red Hen Press

Ted Genoways, award-winning poet and Editor of the Virginia Quarterly Review

Carl Phillips, poet, professor at Washington University in St. Louis, and past Kingsley Tufts Poetry Award recipient

The panel of preliminary judges for the 2012 competition includes:

Jericho Brown, poet, Assistant Professor of English at the University of San Diego

Andrew Feld, poet, editor of the Seattle Review, and assistant professor at the University of Washington

Jennifer Chang, poet, Assistant Professor of creative writing at Bowling Green State University

Distinguished past judges 
Paul Muldoon, Pulitzer Prize for Poetry winner, and poetry editor of The New Yorker

Robert Pinsky, poet, past Poet Laureate Consultant in Poetry to the Library of Congress, and poetry editor at Slate

Charles Harper Webb, Guggenheim Fellowship recipient in 2001, and professor at California State University Long Beach

Submission requirements/deadlines 

Submissions are due annually on July 1, and eligible work has to have been published the previous year (between July and June). Manuscripts, CDs, and chapbooks are not accepted.

Awards ceremony 

Award winners are announced in the February following the July deadline, with a ceremony and presentation of the awards in April, national poetry month. The ceremony takes place on the Claremont Graduate University Campus, and winners are required to accept their award in person.

Distinguished speakers at the Awards Ceremony have included Kathy Bates in 2002, Leonard Nimoy in 2007, and Maxine Hong Kingston in 2012.

Restrictions 

A single work may be submitted for either award only once, although the winner of the Kate Tufts Discovery Award may submit another work in a later year for the Kingsley Tufts Poetry Award.

The Kingsley Tufts Poetry Award winner, by accepting the award, agrees to spend one week in residence at Claremont Graduate University for lectures and poetry readings in Claremont and the greater Los Angeles area.

The poet must be an American citizen or legal resident alien of the United States.

Winners

References

External links 
 Claremont Graduate University
 Foothill: a journal of poetry
 Tufts Facebook Page
 Tufts Vimeo Page
 2011 Kingsley and Kate Tufts Poetry Awards
Kathy Bates on Suffering and the Imagination at the 2002 Kingsley and Kate Tufts Poetry Awards

Claremont Graduate University
American poetry awards
First book awards
Literary awards honoring writers
Awards established in 1993
Awards established in 1994
1993 establishments in California
1994 establishments in California